Tsepelka is a rural locality (a village) in Sidorovskoye Rural Settlement, Gryazovetsky District, Vologda Oblast, Russia. The population was 12 as of 2002.

Geography 
Tsepelka is located 54 km southeast of Gryazovets (the district's administrative centre) by road. Ivonino is the nearest rural locality.

References 

Rural localities in Gryazovetsky District